Baa Atoll Education Centre (Dhivehi: ބ. އަތޮޅު ތަޢުލީމީ މަރުކަޒު ), the first Maldivian government school established outside of Malé, was inaugurated on February 24, 1978 by the then Minister of Education Abdul Sattar Moosa Didi. It then had 58 students and three teachers. Baa Atoll Education Centre, which began as a primary school, now provides primary, secondary and higher secondary education. Today, BAEC is recognized throughout as one of the best schools in the country, a recognition borne out by the fact that nearly 33% of the school's student population is derived from islands other than Eydhafushi, from the north and the south alike.

School houses

School motto
Do the best – Be the best

References

External links
 
 History of B.A.E.C. (from 1978 - 2006) 

Educational institutions established in 1978
Schools in the Maldives
1978 establishments in the Maldives